Events in the year 2020 in Sierra Leone.

Incumbents
 President: Julius Maada Bio

Events

31 March – First confirmed case of COVID-19 in Sierra Leone
23 December – After serving time in Rwanda for war crimes since 2009, former Revolutionary United Front (RUF) leader Augustine Gbao, 72, is returned to Blama to serve the remainder of his 25-year sentence.

Deaths

5 March – Solomon Berewa, politician, Vice-President (b. 1938).
21 March – Eldred D. Jones, literary critic (b. 1925).
18 May – Minkailu Bah, politician.
18 July – Baba Ibrahim Suma-Keita, long-distance runner (b. 1947).

See also
COVID-19 pandemic in Sierra Leone
2020 in West Africa

References

 
2020s in Sierra Leone 
Years of the 21st century in Sierra Leone 
Sierra Leone 
Sierra Leone